Nay Soe Maung (born 17 November 1956) is a Burmese physician and professor who served as Rector of the University of Public Health, Yangon from 2013 to 2017, and as President of the People's Health Foundation. He is also known as the anti-tobacco control activist in Myanmar.

Early life and education
Nay Soe was born on 17 November 1956 in Yangon, Myanmar. He is the son of Major general Tin Sein, a former Deputy Defense Minister of Burma. He graduated with MBBS and Diploma from University of Medicine 1, Yangon, MPH and ICHD from Prince Leopold Institute of Tropical Medicine, Belgium, and Master of Development Study from University of Economics, Yangon.

Career
Nay Soe Maung became an army doctor in Myanmar Army Medical Corps and Military Hospital up to the rank of a colonel after his graduation. He also served as a lecturer, professor and later head of Department of Health Policy in the University of Public Health, Yangon. Afterwards, he was appointed as Rector of the University of Public Health, Yangon in 2013. 

He has over 20 years of medical research experiences the majority of which is focused on disease control on CD as well as NCD including neglected tropical diseases as Lymphatic Filariasis, Malaria, DHF etc. Nay Soe Maung has a strong research experiences including CD, NCD, Environmental Health, Health System Strengthening and Health Policy and System research.

He is currently the president of the Myanmar Hiking and Mountaineering Federation and vice-president of the Myanmar Organization for Road Safety (MORS).

In the aftermath of the 2021 Myanmar coup d'état, Nay Soe Maung posted a photo of himself supporting the demonstration on Facebook, saying that as a retired public official, he stood together with the public and the truth.

Award
He was awarded "World No Tobacco Day 2014 Award" by World Health Organization for his devoted works and major contribution to Tobacco Control Program of Myanmar.

Personal life
Nay married Kyi Kyi Shwe, a daughter of dictator Than Shwe. They have one son, Nay Shwe Thway Aung.

References

External links

Living people
1956 births
University of Medicine 1, Yangon alumni
Burmese public health doctors
Burmese activists
Family of Than Shwe
Burmese military doctors